Ethel Waters (October 31, 1896 – September 1, 1977) was an American singer and actress. Waters frequently performed jazz, swing, and pop music on the Broadway stage and in concerts. She began her career in the 1920s singing blues. Her notable recordings include "Dinah", "Stormy Weather", "Taking a Chance on Love", "Heat Wave", "Supper Time", "Am I Blue?", "Cabin in the Sky", "I'm Coming Virginia", and her version of "His Eye Is on the Sparrow". Waters was the second African American to be nominated for an Academy Award, the first African American to star on her own television show, and the first African-American woman to be nominated for a Primetime Emmy Award.

Early life
Waters was born in Chester, Pennsylvania on October 31, 1896 (some sources incorrectly state her birth year as 1900) as a result of the rape of her teenaged African-American mother, Louise Anderson (1881–1962), by 17-year-old John Wesley (or Wesley John) Waters (1878–1901), a pianist and family acquaintance from a middle-class African-American background. Waters' family was very fair-skinned, his mother in particular. Many sources, including Ethel herself, reported for years that her mother was 12 or 13 years old at the time of the rape, 13 when Ethel was born. Stephen Bourne opens his 2007 biography, Ethel Waters: Stormy Weather, with the statement that genealogical research has shown that Louise Anderson may have been 15 or 16 years old.

Waters played no role in raising his daughter. Soon after she was born, her mother married Norman Howard, a railroad worker, with whom she had a daughter, Juanita Howard, Ethel's half-sister. Ethel used the surname Howard as a child and then reverted to using the surname Waters. She was raised in poverty by Sally Anderson, her grandmother, who worked as a housemaid, and with two of her aunts and an uncle. Waters never lived in the same place for more than 15 months. Of her difficult childhood, she said "I never was a child. I never was cuddled, liked, or understood by my family."

Waters grew tall, standing  in her teens. According to jazz historian and archivist Rosetta Reitz, Waters's birth in the North and her peripatetic (or nomadic) life exposed her to many cultures. Waters first married in 1910 at the age of 13, but her husband was abusive, and she soon left the marriage and became a maid in a Philadelphia hotel, working for $4.75 per week. On her 17th birthday, she attended a costume party at a nightclub on Juniper Street. She was persuaded to sing two songs and impressed the audience so much that she was offered professional work at the Lincoln Theatre in Baltimore. She recalled that she earned the rich sum of $10 per week, but her managers cheated her out of the tips her admirers threw on the stage.

Career

Singing
After her start in Baltimore, Waters toured on the black vaudeville circuit, in her words "from nine until unconscious." Despite her early success, she fell on hard times and joined a carnival traveling in freight cars headed for Chicago. She enjoyed her time with the carnival and recalled, "the roustabouts and the concessionaires were the kind of people I'd grown up with, rough, tough, full of larceny towards strangers, but sentimental and loyal to their friends and co-workers." But she did not last long with them and soon headed south to Atlanta, where she worked in the same club as Bessie Smith. Smith demanded that Waters not compete in singing blues opposite her. Waters conceded and sang ballads and popular songs. Around 1919, Waters moved to Harlem and became a performer in the Harlem Renaissance of the 1920s.

Her first Harlem job was at Edmond's Cellar, a club with a black patronage that specialized in popular ballads. She acted in a blackface comedy, Hello 1919. Jazz historian Rosetta Reitz pointed out that by the time Waters returned to Harlem in 1921, women blues singers were among the most powerful entertainers in the country. In 1921, Waters became the fifth black woman to make a record, for tiny Cardinal Records. She later joined Black Swan, where Fletcher Henderson was her accompanist. Waters later commented that Henderson tended to perform in a more classical style than she preferred, often lacking "the damn-it-to-hell bass."

She recorded for Black Swan from 1921 through 1923. Her contract with Harry Pace made her the highest paid black recording artist at the time. In early 1924, Paramount bought Black Swan, and she stayed with Paramount through the year.

Around that time, Waters was approached by Maury Greenwald for the London run of Plantation Days, although she later joined the company on its return to Chicago in August 1923, as an "extra added attraction" to "save the fast-flopping revue".

She started working with Pearl Wright, and they toured in the South. In 1924, Waters played at the Plantation Club on Broadway. She also toured with the Black Swan Dance Masters. 

She first recorded for Columbia in 1925, achieving a hit with "Dinah".

With Earl Dancer, she joined what was called the "white time" Keith Vaudeville Circuit, a vaudeville circuit performing for white audiences and combined with screenings of silent movies. They received rave reviews in Chicago and earned the unheard-of salary of US$1,250 in 1928. In September 1926, Waters recorded "I'm Coming Virginia", composed by Donald Heywood with lyrics by Will Marion Cook. She is often wrongly attributed as the author. The following year, Waters sang it in a production of Africana at Broadway's Daly's Sixty-Third Street Theatre. In 1929, Waters and Wright arranged the unreleased Harry Akst song "Am I Blue?", which was used in the movie On with the Show and became a hit and her signature song.

Film, theater and television

In 1933, Waters appeared in a satirical all-black film, Rufus Jones for President, which featured the child performer Sammy Davis Jr. as Rufus Jones.

She went on to star at the Cotton Club, where, according to her autobiography, she "sang 'Stormy Weather' from the depths of the private hell in which I was being crushed and suffocated." In 1933, she had a featured role in the successful Irving Berlin Broadway musical revue As Thousands Cheer with Clifton Webb, Marilyn Miller, and Helen Broderick.

She became the first black woman to integrate Broadway's theater district more than a decade after actor Charles Gilpin's critically acclaimed performances in the plays of Eugene O'Neill beginning with The Emperor Jones in 1920.

Waters held three jobs: in As Thousands Cheer, as a singer for Jack Denny & His Orchestra on a national radio program, and in nightclubs. She became the highest-paid performer on Broadway. Despite this status, she had difficulty finding work. She moved to Los Angeles to appear in the 1942 film Cairo. During the same year, she reprised her starring stage role as Petunia in the all-black film musical Cabin in the Sky directed by Vincente Minnelli, and starring Lena Horne as the ingenue. Conflicts arose when Minnelli swapped songs from the original script between Waters and Horne: Waters wanted to perform "Honey in the Honeycomb" as a ballad, but Horne wanted to dance to it. Horne broke her ankle and the songs were reversed. She got the ballad and Waters the dance. Waters sang the Academy Award nominated "Happiness is Just a Thing Called Joe".

In 1939, Waters became the first African American to star in her own television show, before the debut of Nat King Cole's in 1956. The Ethel Waters Show, a variety special, appeared on NBC on June 14, 1939. It included a dramatic performance of the Broadway play Mamba's Daughters, based on the Gullah community of South Carolina and produced with her in mind. The play was based on the novel by DuBose Heyward.

Waters was nominated for an Academy Award for Best Supporting Actress for the film Pinky (1949) under the direction of Elia Kazan after the first director, John Ford, quit over disagreements with Waters. According to producer Darryl F. Zanuck, Ford "hated that old...woman (Waters)." Ford, Kazan stated, "didn't know how to reach Ethel Waters." Kazan later referred to Waters's "truly odd combination of old-time religiosity and free-flowing hatred."

In 1950, she won the New York Drama Critics Circle Award for her performance opposite Julie Harris in the play The Member of the Wedding. Waters and Harris repeated their roles in the 1952 film version.

In 1950, Waters was the first African-American actress to star in a television series, Beulah, which aired on ABC television from 1950 through 1952.

It was the first nationally broadcast weekly television series starring an African American in the leading role. She starred as Beulah for the first year of the TV series before quitting in 1951, complaining that the portrayal of blacks was "degrading." She was replaced by Louise Beavers in the second and third season. She guest-starred in 1957 and 1959 on NBC's The Ford Show, Starring Tennessee Ernie Ford. In a 1957 segment, she sang "Cabin in the Sky".

Personal life
Her first autobiography, His Eye Is on the Sparrow, (1951), written with Charles Samuels, was adapted for the stage by Larry Parr and premiered on October 7, 2005.

In 1953, she appeared in a Broadway show, At Home With Ethel Waters that opened on September 22, 1953 and closed October 10 after 23 performances.

Waters married three times and had no children. When she was 13, she married Merritt "Buddy" Purnsley in 1909; they divorced in 1913. During the 1920s, Waters was involved in a romantic relationship with dancer Ethel Williams. The two were dubbed "The Two Ethels" and lived together in Harlem. She married Clyde Edwards Matthews in 1929, and they divorced in 1933. She married Edward Mallory in 1938; they divorced in 1945. Waters was the great-aunt of the singer-songwriter Crystal Waters.

In 1938, Waters met artist Luigi Lucioni through their mutual friend, Carl Van Vechten. Lucioni asked Waters if he could paint her portrait, and a sitting was arranged at his studio at 64 Washington Square South. Waters bought the finished portrait from Lucioni in 1939 for $500. She was at the height of her career and the first African American to have a starring role on Broadway. In her portrait, she wore a tailored red dress with a mink coat draped over the back of her chair. Lucioni positioned Waters with her arms tightly wrapped around her waist, a gesture that conveyed vulnerability, as if she were trying to protect herself. The painting was considered lost because it had not been seen in public since 1942. Huntsville (Alabama) Museum of Art Executive Director Christopher J. Madkour and historian Stuart Embury traced it to a private residence. The owner considered Waters to be "an adopted grandmother" but she allowed the Huntsville Museum of Art to display Portrait of Ethel Waters in the 2016 exhibition American Romantic: The Art of Luigi Lucioni where it was viewed by the public for the first time in more than 70 years. The museum acquired Portrait of Ethel Waters in 2017, and it was shown in an exhibition in February 2018.

A turning point came in 1957 when she attended the Billy Graham Crusade in Madison Square Garden. Years later, she gave this testimony of that night: "In 1957, I, Ethel Waters, a 380-pound decrepit old lady, rededicated my life to Jesus Christ, and boy, because He lives, just look at me now. I tell you because He lives; and because my precious child, Billy, gave me the opportunity to stand there, I can thank God for the chance to tell you His eye is on all of us sparrows." In her later years, Waters often toured with the preacher Billy Graham on his crusades. She was a baptized Catholic and considered herself a member of that religion throughout her life.

Waters died on September 1, 1977, aged 80, from uterine cancer, kidney failure, and other ailments, in Chatsworth, California. She is buried at Forest Lawn Memorial Park (Glendale).

Ethel was written and performed by Terry Burrell as a one-woman tribute to Waters. It ran as a limited engagement in February and March 2012.

Awards and honors
 Her recording of "Stormy Weather" (1933) was listed in the National Recording Registry by the National Recording Preservation Board of the Library of Congress in 2003.
 Gospel Music Hall of Fame, 1983
 Christian Music Hall of Fame, 2007
 Waters was approved for a star on the Hollywood Walk of Fame in 2004; however, the star was never funded or installed.
 In 2015, a historical marker memorializing Waters was unveiled along Route 291 in Chester, Pennsylvania to recognize her life and talents in the city of her birth.
 Commemorative stamp, U.S. Post Office, 1994
 Nomination, Best Supporting Actress, Academy Awards, Pinky 1949
 Nomination, Outstanding Single Performance by an Actress in a Series, Primetime Emmy Awards, for Route 66 "Goodnight Sweet Blues", 1962
 Three recordings by Waters were inducted into the Grammy Hall of Fame, a special Grammy Award established in 1973 to honor recordings that are at least twenty-five years old and have "qualitative or historical significance."

Hit records

Filmography

Features
 On with the Show (1929) as Ethel
 Gift of Gab (1934) as Ethel Waters
 Tales of Manhattan (1942) as Esther
 Cairo (1942) as Cleona Jones
 Cabin in the Sky (1943) as Petunia Jackson
 Stage Door Canteen (1943) as Ethel Waters
 Pinky (1949) as Dicey Johnson
 The Member of the Wedding (1952) as Berenice Sadie Brown
 Carib Gold (1957) as Mom
 The Heart Is a Rebel (1958) as Gladys
 The Sound and the Fury (1959) as Dilsey

Short subjects

 Rufus Jones for President (1933) as Mother of Rufus Jones
 Bubbling Over (1934) as Ethel Peabody
 Let My People Live (1939)

Television
 First African American, male or female, to star in own TV show, The Ethel Waters Show, which was broadcast on NBC on June 14, 1939.
 Starred in title role of Beulah on ABC-TV from 1950 to 1951.
 TV guest appearances from 1950 to 1952 on The Jackie Gleason Show, Texaco Star Theater, This Is Show Business, What's My Line?, and The Chesterfield Supper Club
 Person to Person (1954)
 Whirlybirds, episode "The Big Lie" (1959)
 Route 66, episode "Good Night, Sweet Blues" (1961)
 The Hollywood Palace, hosted by Diana Ross and the Supremes (1969)
 Daniel Boone, episode "Mamma Cooper" (1970)

Stage appearances
 Hello 1919! (1919)
 Jump Steady (1922)
 Plantation Days (1923 re-run of 1922 production)
 Plantation Revue (1925)
 Black Bottom (1926)
 Miss Calico (1926–27)
 Paris Bound (1927)
 Africana (1927)
 The Ethel Waters Broadway Revue (1928)
 Lew Leslie's Blackbirds (1930)
 Rhapsody in Black (1931)
 Broadway to Harlem (1932)
 As Thousands Cheer (1933–34)
 At Home Abroad (1935–36)
 Mamba's Daughters (1939; 1940)
 Cabin in the Sky (1940–41)
 Laugh Time (1943)
 Blue Holiday (1945)
 The Member of the Wedding (1950–51)
 At Home with Ethel Waters (1953)
 The Voice of Strangers (1956)

References

Further reading
 
 
 
  Underneath A Harlem Moon by Iain Cameron Williams

External links

 Ethel Waters discography 
 Ethel Waters at the African American Registry
 
 Ethel Waters 1896-1977 at Red Hot Jazz Archive
 Ethel Waters recordings at the Discography of American Historical Recordings.
 

1896 births
1977 deaths
Musicians from Philadelphia
People from Chester, Pennsylvania
Singers from Pennsylvania
Jazz musicians from Pennsylvania
20th-century American actresses
20th-century American singers
20th-century American women singers
African-American actresses
20th-century African-American women singers
American women jazz singers
American film actresses
American gospel singers
American jazz singers
American stage actresses
Bisexual musicians
Bisexual women
Burials at Forest Lawn Memorial Park (Glendale)
Classic female blues singers
Deaths from kidney failure
Deaths from uterine cancer
Jubilee Records artists
LGBT African Americans
LGBT actresses
LGBT people from Pennsylvania
American LGBT singers
Torch singers
Vaudeville performers
Biograph Records artists
Mercury Records artists
Paramount Records artists
RCA Victor artists
Vocalion Records artists
African-American Catholics
20th-century American LGBT people